The United States Student Association (USSA) is an American student organization. According to Inside Higher Education in 2015, it was the largest of a number of student associations that were arguing for free higher education.

See also
Oregon Student Association
Jobs with Justice
Student/Farmworker Alliance

References

External links
USSA

Student political organizations in the United States
Student governments in the United States
Groups of students' unions
Student organizations established in 1947
1947 establishments in the United States
Education advocacy groups
Lobbying organizations based in Washington, D.C.
Student government